Rimhak Ree (alternative spelling: Im-hak Ree, December 18, 1922 – January 9, 2005) was a Korean Canadian mathematician.

Early life
Ree received his early education in Hamhung, South Hamgyong, in what is now North Korea; he attended the Hamhung #1 Public Ordinary School, and in 1934 entered the Hamhung Public High School. He went onto Keijō Imperial University, where he studied physics, which was an unusual choice for Koreans at the time. Ree graduated in 1944 with a physics degree; he then went to Fengtian, Manchukuo (today Shenyang, Liaoning in the People's Republic of China) to work for an aircraft company.

Career
After the surrender of Japan in 1945 and the end of Japanese rule in Korea, Ree returned to his home country and in 1947 took up a teaching position in the mathematics department at Seoul National University as an assistant professor. Later that year, in Namdaemun Market, Ree found an issue of the Bulletin of the American Mathematical Society, which proposedly was left by an American soldier. On the Bulletin was the paper 'Note on power series', in which Max Zorn solved a problem about the convergence of certain power series with complex coefficients. In the paper, Zorn posed a question of whether the same result held for power series with real coefficients. Ree solved the problem and sent the solution to Max Zorn. When Zorn received Ree's solution, it was sent to the Bulletin of the American Mathematical Society to be published in 1949 with the title 'On a problem of Max Zorn' and become the first mathematical paper published by a Korean in an international journal.

During the Korean War, he fled south to Busan, and in 1953 he was awarded a Canadian Scholarship to allow him to study for a Ph.D. degree at the University of British Columbia in Vancouver, Canada. He completed his dissertation on Witt algebras in 1955. His thesis advisor was Stephen Arthur Jennings. Following the award of his doctorate, Ree was appointed as a lecturer at Montana State University, despite facing several problems regarding his labour permission and nationality.

In mid-1955, Ree received a grant from the National Research Council of Canada and he worked with Jennings on Lie algebras. In 1958, he published a solution to a problem of Paul Erdős regarding a certain class of irrational numbers. Ree's two most renowned papers were written from 1960 to 1961, in which he suggested a Lie type group over a finite field now named after him. In 1962 after being promoted to an assistant professor in mathematics at University of British Columbia, he was granted an academic year which he spent in Yale. He was elected a member of Royal Society of Canada in 1964.

Personal life

Family
Ree had two daughters Erran and Hiran from his first marriage. He later married Rhoda Mah, a doctor and the daughter of John Ming Mah, who owned  Northwest Food Products, a manufacturers of noodles. She would go on to work as staff physician for Canadian Pacific Airlines. Rimhak and Rhoda's first son Ronald was followed by another son Robert in December 1971. They also had a third son Richard. 

Ree died on January 9, 2005, in Vancouver, Canada.

Statelessness
Ree refused the order, which caused him considerable difficulty, but in the end the Canadian government treated him as a de facto stateless person and granted him permanent residency in Canada. Afterwards, he continued to work at the University of British Columbia.

Though Ree secured his immigration status in Canada, he continued to encounter difficulties with the South Korean government. Ree's family was divided by the Korean War, with his father, older sister, and other relatives having stayed in their hometown of Hamhung. Hamhung was the site of a munitions factory built during Japanese rule, making the city a frequent target for bombing by the United States Air Force during the Korean War, and Lee did not know if any of his relatives there had survived the war. He visited North Korea using his Canadian passport various times for academic exchanges, but he was not able to travel freely in North Korea and thus had no success in making contact with his relatives; furthermore, his visits to North Korea led South Korea's Park Chung-hee military government to place an entry ban on him. Ree requested help from Erdős, who as an internationally-famous Hungarian citizen faced fewer restrictions on travel or communication in either capitalist or communist countries. Finally, in the 1980s, Erdős was able to make contact with several relatives of Ree's with the help of Hungary's Ministry of Foreign Affairs and the country's embassy in Pyongyang, and sent Ree an envelope containing their letters, photographs, and addresses. Ree was so excited by the news that he forwarded the envelope to his mother and younger sister in South Korea, which reportedly resulted in them being investigated by South Korea's intelligence services. According to his colleagues, Rimhak Ree identified his nationality as "Joseon", which is a former name of Korea as well as a current autonym of North Korea.

Publications

Notes

References

External links

1922 births
2005 deaths
South Korean emigrants to Canada
Korean expatriates in China
Canadian mathematicians
20th-century Korean mathematicians
Korean people of Manchukuo
People from Hamhung
Seoul National University alumni
University of British Columbia alumni
Academic staff of Seoul National University
Academic staff of the University of British Columbia